Boom is an unincorporated community in Pickett County, Tennessee.

History
A post office called Boom was established in 1904, and remained in operation until 1955. The community was so named on account of a nearby log boom.

References

Unincorporated communities in Pickett County, Tennessee
Unincorporated communities in Tennessee